Argentine Montenegrins are people born in Argentina of Montenegrin descent. During the early 1900s, Montenegrins from the Kingdom of Montenegro began emigrating to the country, and nowadays there are approximately 50,000 Montenegrins and descendants living in Argentina. Besides Poles (450,000) and Croatians (440,000) they are one of the most populous Slavic communities in Argentina. Currently most of them are located in the northern province of Chaco, while the remaining part lives in Buenos Aires, Tandil, Venado Tuerto, and General Madariaga.

Descendants of ethnic Montenegrins established Colonia La Montenegrina, the largest Montenegrin colony in South America, in which they are part of even today. General Madariaga is a specially important place for Montenegrins in Argentina since many of them have achieved a remarkable wealth there through the business of cattle breeding, and most Montenegrins and their descendants are buried in its cemetery. Additionally, the Montenegrin-Argentine organization, Yugoslav Society Njegoš (Sociedad Yugoslava Njegoš, previously called the Montenegrin Society and Montenegrin-Yugoslav Society for Mutual Aid before World War II) provides mutual aid inside the town.

Notable individuals
Jorge Capitanich, politician, former senator and current governor of the Chaco Province
Emilio Ogñénovich, Roman Catholic bishop of the Roman Catholic Archdiocese of Mercedes-Luján, Argentina
Esteban Saveljich, football player
Gastón Bojanich, football player
Nicolás Vuyovich, sportscar driver

References

External links
Association of ethnic Montenegrins in Argentina "Zeta"

European Argentine
Immigration to Argentina
Argentine